Ice Records is a record label based in Barbados owned by musician Eddy Grant. In addition to Grant's music, the label also seeks "to record, promote and market classic calypso, soca and ringbang (Grant's fusion of various Caribbean music forms)." Ice Records lays claim to owning the largest catalog of Caribbean music in the world.

Artist roster
Black Stalin
Calypso Rose
Grynner
Lord Kitchener
Mighty Gabby
Mighty Sparrow
Roaring Lion
Superblue
Square One

See also
 List of record labels

References

External links
 Ice Records 

Barbadian record labels
Entertainment companies of Barbados
Caribbean music record labels
Calypso music
Soca music